Takihi is a Niuean dish made from thinly sliced taro and papaya, layered and dressed with coconut milk and baked. It is considered the national dish of Niue.

References 

Niuean cuisine
National dishes
Fruit dishes
Foods containing coconut
Papaya dishes